The Moroccan Throne Cup was won by FAR de Rabat, who beat Wydad AC in the final.

Quarter-finals 

|-
| 26 June 2004 || align=right|FUS de Rabat || align="center" | 1–0 || Raja de Casablanca
|- style="background:#EFEFEF"
| 27 June 2004 || align=right|Olympique Dcheira || align="center" | 1–2|| Wydad AC
|-
| 27 June 2004 ||align=right| FAR de Rabat|| align="center" | 1–0  || Union de Touarga
|- style="background:#EFEFEF"
| 27 June 2004 || align=right|JS Massira  || align="center" | 2–1|| Hassania d'Agadir
|}

Semi-finals 

|-
| 11 September  2004 ||align=right| FAR de Rabat|| align="center" | 1–0 || JS Massira
|- style="background:#EFEFEF"
| 12 September 2004 ||align=right| Wydad AC  || align="center" | 2–0 || FUS de Rabat
|}

Final 

2003
2003–04 in Moroccan football